Antoine Parachini (13 July 1897 – 9 November 1963) was a French footballer. He competed in the men's tournament at the 1924 Summer Olympics.

References

External links
 

1897 births
1963 deaths
French footballers
France international footballers
Olympic footballers of France
Footballers at the 1924 Summer Olympics
People from Sète
Association football midfielders
Sportspeople from Hérault
Footballers from Occitania (administrative region)